The National Archery Federation of Armenia, also known as the Armenian Archery Federation, is the regulating body of archery in Armenia, governed by the Armenian Olympic Committee. The headquarters of the federation is located in Yerevan.

History
The Federation was established in 1993 and the current president is Nazik Amiryan. The Federation is a full member of the World Archery Federation and World Archery Europe. Armenian archers participate in various European, international and Olympic level archery competitions, including the World Archery Championships. The Federation also organizes national tournaments and archery training events.

Between 2010 and 2011, the Federation hosted and organized two consecutive European level archery competitions in Armenia.

See also
 Sport in Armenia

References

External links 
 National Archery Federation of Armenia on Facebook

Sports governing bodies in Armenia
Archery in Armenia
Armenia